Chlorophorus figuratus is a species of round-necked longhorns belonging to the family Cerambycidae, subfamily Cerambycinae.

Etymology
The genus name Chlorophorus derives from the Greek word chlorós meaning "green" and  phorós meaning  "wearing", while the specific name figuratus means "decorated with figures".

Distribution
This widespread beetle is present in most of Europe (Albania, Austria, Belarus, Bosnia and Herzegovina, Bulgaria, Croatia, Czech Republic, France, Germany, Greece, Hungary, Italy, Montenegro, North Macedonia, Poland, Portugal, Romania, Russia, Serbia, Slovakia, Slovenia, Spain, Switzerland), and in the eastern Palearctic realm (Kazakhstan, Turkey, Armenia, Georgia, Iran).

Habitat
These beetles mainly inhabit meadows and sunny forest edges.

Description
The body is elongated and cylindrical. The pronotum is about as wide as the elytra. The elytra are cut off at the end. Head, pronotum and elytra are black or brownish and the elytrae show various hairy gray stripes.

This species is rather similar to Chlorophorus sartor, but in C. sartor the gray humeral stripe is missing.

Biology
Adults can be encountered from May through Augusty., completing their life cycle in two year. Larvae are polyphagous in deciduous trees. They mainly feed on hazel (Corylus avellana), sweet chestnut (Castanea sativa), wild plum (Prunus domestica), blackthorn (Prunus spinosa) and spindle (Euonymus europaeus). The adults can be easily encountered on Apiaceae species.

References

External links
 Inaturalist
 Insecta.pro
 Entomoland

Clytini
Beetles of Europe
Beetles described in 1763
Taxa named by Giovanni Antonio Scopoli